Live at Sónar is the first live DJ mix album by Miss Kittin. For the Sónar festival, Miss Kittin provided impromptu new vocals to her classic catalogue.  During the festival, she was assisted by Aphex Twin, Modeselektor, Boom Bip, and The Hacker.

Track listing

Personnel
 Live DJ Mix, Vocals, Effects – Miss Kittin 
 Digital Editing, Postproduction – Cristian Vogel, Enric Palau 
 Mastering – Cristian Vogel 
 Licensing – Gemma Martínez 
 Photography – Biel Capllonch 
 Recording Production – Pedri Gonzáles

Source:

Charts

References

Miss Kittin albums
2006 live albums
Live electronica albums
Novamute Records live albums